Vesicopustular dermatosis is a cutaneous condition characterized by neutrophils, and associated with bowel disorders.

See also 
 Pyostomatitis vegetans
 List of cutaneous conditions

References 

Reactive neutrophilic cutaneous conditions